Notonomus tubericauda is a species of ground beetle in the subfamily Pterostichinae. It was described by Henry Walter Bates in 1878.

References

Notonomus
Beetles described in 1878